Josef "Pepi" Stroh (5 March 1913 – 7 January 1991) was an Austrian footballer and football manager. He played club football mainly with FK Austria Wien.

International career
A striker, his most prominent moments came during the 1934 FIFA World Cup and the 1948 Summer Olympics when he was a member of the Austria national football team. He also played for the Germany national football team. He was also part of Austria's squad for the football tournament at the 1948 Summer Olympics, but he did not play in any matches.

He coached SC Wr. Neustadt, FC Wien, SC Schwechat, Jönköpings Södra IF, Malmö FF, IFK Göteborg, SK Brann, Sandvikens IF and Sportklub.

References

1913 births
1991 deaths
Austrian footballers
Austria international footballers
German footballers
Germany international footballers
1934 FIFA World Cup players
1938 FIFA World Cup players
Olympic footballers of Austria
Footballers at the 1948 Summer Olympics
FK Austria Wien players
Austrian football managers
Jönköpings Södra IF managers
Malmö FF managers
IFK Göteborg managers
Dual internationalists (football)
SK Brann managers
Sandvikens IF managers
Wiener Sport-Club managers
Association football forwards